Franz Pfemfert (20 November 1879, Lötzen, East Prussia (now Giżycko, Poland) – 26 May 1954, Mexico City) was a German journalist, editor of Die Aktion, literary critic, politician and portrait photographer. Pfemfert occasionally wrote under the pseudonym U. Gaday (derived from Russian "ugadaj", dt: "guess").

In 1911 he married Alexandra Ramm, who had moved to Berlin from Russia and who was involved in Russian translations.

Pfemfert was involved in founding the Antinationalen Sozialisten-Partei (Antinational Socialist Party), originally a clandestine organisation founded in 1915. Die Aktion became its official organ following the German Revolution in November 1918.

He subsequently became close friends with Leon Trotsky, even though he maintained quite distinct political views.

After the Nazi seizure of power, Pfemfert fled to Karlovy Vary, Czechoslovakia. Here the Czech stalinists called for his deportation.

Publishing
Alongside publishing Die Aktion, Pfemfert published a variety of authors:

 Victor Hugo
 Hedwig Dohm
 Franz Jung
 Leo Tolstoy
 Karl Otten

References

External links
 Franz Pfemfert Archive at marxists.org

1879 births
1954 deaths
People from Giżycko
Communist Workers' Party of Germany politicians
German journalists
German male journalists
People from the Province of Prussia
German male writers
German publishers (people)
German emigrants to Czechoslovakia